Strebel is a German surname and may refer to:

 Annika Strebel (b. 1987), the 2011/2012 German Wine Queen.
 Gustave Adolph Strebel (1875-1945), socialist candidate for Governor of New York in the New York state election, 1914
 Hermann Strebel (1834–1914), German malacologist.
 Kurt Strebel (1921–2013), Swiss mathematician.
 Monica Strebel, Swiss actress.
 Pascal Strebel (1988), Swiss Greco-Roman wrestler.
 Roger Strebel (1908–1981), Swiss racing cyclist.

German-language surnames
Surnames from nicknames